Porcellio duboscqui is a species of woodlouse in the genus Porcellio belonging to the family Porcellionidae that can be found in France and Spain.

References

Porcellionidae
Woodlice of Europe
Crustaceans described in 1941